Environments 4 is the fourth in The Future Sound of London's "Environments" series of albums, released on 30 April 2012.

Track listing
 "The Wheel of Life" (3:57)
 "No Man's Land" (1:15)
 "River Delta" (4:09)
 "Supercontinents" (2:01)
 "Sediment" (2:52)
 "Architektur" (5:12)
 "Murmurations" (6:27)
 "Sunsets" (3:30)
 "Photosynthesis" (2:34)
 "Stand a Little Less Between Me and the Sun" (1:42)
 "Fibrillation" (5:43)
 "Long Day" (2:41)
 "Vast Landscape" (5:21)
 "Clear Light of Reality" (2:37)
 "Plough" (Bonus Track) (4:28)

References

2012 albums
The Future Sound of London albums